Yang Boyu (born 24 June 1989 in Dalian) is a Chinese footballer who plays as a defender for Shenzhen in the Chinese Super League.

Club career 
At the beginning of the 2008 Chinese Super League season Yang Boyu would break into the senior team of Dalian Shide F.C. after graduating from their youth team. He would make his debut senior appearance for Dalian on 25 June 2008 against Liaoning FC in a 2–1 win. As a promising defender Yang Boyu would play in several more games for Dalian during the season and was one of the few bright aspects in a disappointing season for the club which saw Dalian flirt with relegation. At the beginning of the 2009 Chinese Super League Yang Boyu would become a vital member of the squad and go on to establish himself within the team's defence and aid Dalian to an eighth-place finish.

On 26 February 2015, Yang transferred to fellow Chinese Super League side Shanghai SIPG.  On 1 July 2016, Yang was loaned to Chinese Super League side Changchun Yatai until 31 December 2016.

On 13 February 2017, Yang moved to fellow Super League side Jiangsu Suning. On 1 March 2017, he made his debut for Jiangsu in the 2017 AFC Champions League against Adelaide United, coming on as a substitute for Li Ang in the 64th minute. He made his league debut for the club on 5 March 2017 in a 4–0 away defeat against Shanghai Shenhua. He would establish himself as a regular within the team and by the 2020 Chinese Super League season he would win the clubs first league title.

Career statistics 
Statistics accurate as of match played 31 December 2020.

Honours

Club
Jiangsu Suning
Chinese Super League: 2020

References

External links 
 
 Squad profile at Dalian Shide F.C. website
 Player stats at sohu.com

1989 births
Living people
Chinese footballers
Footballers from Dalian
Dalian Shide F.C. players
Dalian Professional F.C. players
Shanghai Port F.C. players
Changchun Yatai F.C. players
Jiangsu F.C. players
Chinese Super League players
Footballers at the 2010 Asian Games
Association football defenders
Asian Games competitors for China